SIP or sip may refer to:

Places
 Šip (Pale), Bosnia and Herzegovina
 Šip (Višegrad), Bosnia and Herzegovina
 Novi Sip, Serbia
 Simferopol International Airport (IATA: SIP), an airport in Crimea
 Suzhou Industrial Park, in Suzhou, China

Business and economics
 Sales incentive plan, a type of employee incentive program
 Share Incentive Plan, a UK government approved employee plan
 Systematic investment plan, an investment strategy
 Safety improvement plan, a plan for improving safety

Communications and telephony
 Session Initiation Protocol (SIP), a communications protocol for signaling and controlling multimedia communication sessions, including voice over IP

Networking
 Service Improvement Plan, a former program to provide a defined level of basic telephone service to all Canadians
 Standard Interchange Protocol, in library systems
 System Information Packet, in the DMX512 standard for stage lighting control

Software
 SIP (software), a tool which generates C++ interface code for the programming language Python
 Scilab Image Processing, an image processing toolbox
 Soft Input Panel, on-screen input method for devices without standard keyboards

 Submission Information Packages, in the Open Archival Information System Reference Model; see Open Archival Information System#The OAIS environment and information model
 System Integrity Protection, a security feature of OS X El Capitan by Apple

Semiconductors
 Semiconductor intellectual property, a business model for licensing intellectual property
 Single in-line package, for packaging electronic components
 System in package, chip technology, also known as a chip stack multi-chip module
 Silicon photonics, silicon semiconductor used as an optical medium

Computing
 Social information processing, an activity through which collective human actions organize knowledge
 Supplementary Ideographic Plane, a range of ideographic characters in the Unicode standard
 Stochastic Information Packet, an array of simulation realizations

Engineering
 Second-order intercept point, a measure of linearity in amplifiers and mixers
 Shelter Implementation Plan, will help contain and manage the consequences of the Chernobyl disaster
 Signature image processing, in welding fault detection
 Sputter ion pump, a type of vacuum pump
 Standard inspection procedure, a process for checking compliance
 Sterilization-in-place, in sanitation of food preparation equipment
 Structural insulated panel, a composite building material

Enterprises
 SIP Animation, originally Saban International Paris, France based TV production company
 Società Italiana per l'Esercizio Telefonico (originally Società Idroelettrica Piemontese), the former name of Telecom Italia
 Selznick International Pictures, a defunct film studio

Science and mathematics
 Semi-infinite programming, a type of mathematical optimization problem
 Spectral induced polarisation, in geophysics
 Stable-isotope probing, used in molecular biology
 Statistically improbable phrases, a system used to find unique phrases for use as keywords
 Stochastic Information Packet, in probability management, a representation of the probability distribution of a variable
 Strongly implicit procedure, an algorithm for solving a sparse linear system of equations
 Structure-inducing probes, a peptide synthesis to stabilize long peptides

Other uses
 "Sip", a song from Joeboy
 Shelter-in-place, an emergency procedure
 Sip (kinship)
 Sip or Zip, one of the 18 months of the Haab', a part of the Maya calendric system
 SIP Grenade, self igniting phosphorus
 Soviet Interview Project, a research project conducted in the early 1980s
 Strangers in Paradise, an award-winning comic book
 State Implementation Plan, a United States state plan for complying with the federal Clean Air Act
 Sub-irrigated planter, a type of gardening container
 Sip as in SipSipStefan
 "Sip", a 2017 song by Chris Brown from Heartbreak on a Full Moon

See also
 
 Social information processing (disambiguation)
Stranger in Paradise (disambiguation)

mk:SIP